Chapter VII of the United Nations Charter sets out the UN Security Council's powers to maintain peace. It allows the Council to "determine the existence of any threat to the peace, breach of the peace, or act of aggression" and to take military and nonmilitary action to "restore international peace and security".

Rationale

The UN Charter's prohibition of member states of the UN attacking other UN member states is central to the purpose for which the UN was founded in the wake of the destruction of World War II: to prevent war. This overriding concern is also reflected in the Nuremberg Trials' concept of a crime against peace "starting or waging a war against the territorial integrity, political independence or sovereignty of a state, or in violation of international treaties or agreements" (crime against peace), which was held to be the crime that makes all war crimes possible.

Chapter VII also gives the Military Staff Committee responsibility for strategic coordination of forces placed at the disposal of the UN Security Council. It is made up of the chiefs of staff of the five permanent members of the Council. Otherwise, that chapter is used when «the UNSC is authorizing either a member state or a coalition of the willing to act nationally or through regional organizations to address this threat – if necessary with all necessary measures, including the use of outright force. The phrase ‘all necessary measures’ is to be taken literally. Any military action performed through land, air, and sea forces is specifically allowed (UN Charter Article 42). Such action could entail troop deployment, the enforcement of a no-fly-zone, even the use of aerial bombardment».

Historical background
The United Nations was established after World War II  and the ultimate failure of diplomacy despite the existence of the League of Nations in the years between the First and Second World War. The Security Council was thus granted broad powers through Chapter VII as a reaction to the failure of the League. These broad powers allow it to enjoy greater power than any other international organization in history. It can be argued that the strong executive powers granted to it give it the role of 'executive of the international community' or even of an 'international government'.

The covenant of the League of Nations provided, for the first time in history, enforcement of international responsibilities (i.e. adhering to the Covenant of the League of Nations) through economic and military sanctions. Member states were also obliged, even without prior decision by the council to take action against states that acted unlawfully in the eyes of the League's Covenant. This meant that the peace process was largely dependent on the willingness of member states, because the Covenant of the League of Nations did not provide binding decisions; The Council of the League was only responsible for recommending military force. As well as this, Article 11 paragraph 1 of the Covenant states:

This can be seen as an authorization of the use of force and other enforcement measures, however, states repeatedly insisted that this did not make decisions by the League binding.

This resulted in an unprecedented will by both the powers at the Dumbarton Oaks Conference and the states present at the San Francisco Conference to submit to a central organ like that of the Security Council. Despite long debate over whether the General Assembly should also have power over decisions made by the Security Council, it was eventually decided by a large majority vote that the Security Council should maintain its executive power because, as the major powers emphasized, a strong executive organ would be needed for the maintenance of world peace. This emphasis was advocated in particular by the Chinese representative, recalling the powerlessness of the League during the Manchuria Crisis.

Article 41 and Article 42
Articles 41 and 42 jointly establish the right of the Security Council to arrange for the use of both non-armed (Article 41) and armed (Article 42) measures to put its decisions into effect.

Article 41:

Article 42:

Chapter VII Resolutions 
Most Chapter VII resolutions (1) determine the existence of a threat to the peace, a breach of the peace, or an act of aggression in accordance with Article 39, and (2) make a decision explicitly under Chapter VII. However, not all resolutions are that explicit, there is disagreement about the Chapter VII status of a small number of resolutions. As a reaction to this ambiguity, a formal definition of Chapter VII resolutions has recently been proposed:

Chapter VII resolutions are very rarely isolated measures.  Often the first response to a crisis is a resolution demanding the crisis be ended.  This is only later followed by an actual Chapter VII resolution detailing the measures required to secure compliance with the first resolution.  Sometimes dozens of resolutions are passed in subsequent years to modify and extend the mandate of the first Chapter VII resolution as the situation evolves.

The list of Chapter VII interventions includes:
 United Nations Security Council Resolution 82 (Korea)
 United Nations Security Council Resolution 1267 (Afghanistan)
 United Nations Transitional Administration in East Timor
 United Nations Mission in the Democratic Republic of Congo
 International Criminal Tribunal for Rwanda
 United Nations Mission in Sierra Leone
 United Nations Assistance Mission for Rwanda
 United Nations Angola Verification Mission II
 United Nations Operation in Somalia II
 United Nations Monitoring, Verification and Inspection Commission
 United Nations Protection Force (former Yugoslavia)
 Oil-for-Food Programme (Iraq)
 United Nations Stabilisation Mission in Haiti
 United Nations Security Council Resolution 678 (Gulf War)
 United Nations Security Council Resolution 1973 (Libya)
 United Nations Security Council Resolution 502 (Argentina)
 Special Tribunal for Lebanon

See also Timeline of United Nations peacekeeping missions, some of which were created under the authority of Chapter VI rather than VII.

Article 51: Self-defence 

Article 51 provides for the right of countries to engage in self-defence, including collective self-defence, against an armed attack and was included during the San Francisco Conference in 1945.

Usage by sovereign countries 

Countries, such as the United States during the 2003 invasion of Iraq, Israel during the 2006 Lebanon War, Turkey during Operations Euphrates Shield in Syria, and Claw-Lock in Iraq, and Russia during the 2022 Russian invasion of Ukraine have used this article to legitimize their military incursions abroad.

This article was the impetus for much international pact-making and has been cited by the United States as support for the Nicaragua case and the legality of the Vietnam War. According to that argument, "although South Vietnam is not an independent sovereign State or a member of the United Nations, it nevertheless enjoys the right of self-defense, and the United States is entitled to participate in its collective defense". Another aspect is if the right of self-defense still exists if the security council of the United Nations has taken measures to deal with the conflict. There are contradictory opinions whether this right still exists once the security council took action. Article 51 has been described as difficult to adjudicate with any certainty in real-life.

In a letter to the UN Security Council requesting military intervention in Yemen, Yemen's President Hadi invoked Article 51.

The United States used Article 51 to justify the assassination of Qasem Soleimani and U.S. airstrikes in Iraq and Syria against an Iran-backed militia group.

References

Divisions and sections of the Charter of the United Nations
United Nations Security Council
United Nations peacekeeping